Anti-Slavery Society may refer to:

United Kingdom 
 Society for Effecting the Abolition of the Slave Trade (1787–1807?), also referred to as the Abolition Society
 Anti-Slavery Society (1823–1838), full name Society for the Mitigation and Gradual Abolition of Slavery Throughout the British Dominions
 Anti-Slavery International (1839–present), founded as the British and Foreign Anti-Slavery Society

United States 
 American Anti-Slavery Society (1833–1870)
 Boston Female Anti-Slavery Society (founded 1833)
 The Concord Female Anti-Slavery Society (founded 1837)
 Philadelphia Female Anti-Slavery Society (founded 1833)
 Fall River Female Anti-Slavery Society (founded 1835)
 Ladies’ New York City Anti-Slavery Society (founded 1835)
 Massachusetts Anti-Slavery Society (founded 1835)
 Ohio Anti-Slavery Society (founded 1835)
 Anti-Slavery Convention of American Women (founded 1837)
 Pennsylvania Anti-Slavery Society (founded 1838)
 American and Foreign Anti-Slavery Society (founded 1840)

Others 
 Belgian Anti-Slavery Society (founded 1888)

See also
 :Category:American abolitionist organizations
 Birmingham Ladies Society for the Relief of Negro Slaves, also known as the Ladies Anti-Slavery Society 
 World Anti-Slavery Convention (1840)